The 1916–17 North Carolina Tar Heels men's basketball team (variously "North Carolina", "Carolina" or "Tar Heels") was the seventh varsity college basketball team to represent the University of North Carolina.

Roster and schedule

|+ Schedule
|-
!colspan=6 style="background:#4B9CD3; color:#FFFFFF;"| Regular season

Aftermath

The team was the first North Carolina squad to beat Virginia, which George Tennent later commented "when you beat Virginia in those days, you more or less had it made." The team was brought to Woollen Gymnasium in 1958 for a reunion. After the game, the team went to the North Carolina State Capitol where former teammate and then Governor of North Carolina Luther Hodges received them. The team reminisced and passed around a basketball and wound up breaking a chandelier in the building.

References

Footnotes

Citations

Bibliography

North Carolina
North Carolina Tar Heels men's basketball seasons
North Carolina Tar Heels Men's Basketball
North Carolina Tar Heels Men's Basketball